The Como–Brunate funicular (Italian: Funicolare Como-Brunate) is a funicular railway that connects the city of Como with the village of Brunate in Lombardy, Italy. The line has operated since 1894, and is used by both tourists and local residents.

History 
The funicular was opened in 1894 and was originally operated using a steam engine. In 1911 the traction system was converted to use an electric motor. The line was refurbished in 1934/5 and again in 1951, when new cars were provided.

In 1981 ownership of the funicular was transferred from the private Società Anonima Funicolare Como/Brunate to the government of the region of Lombardy. In 2005 the management of the funicular, along with Como's local bus service, was transferred to a local company, the Consorzio Mobilità Funicolare & Bus. The Consorzio further subcontracts the operation of the funicular to the Azienda Trasporti Milanesi S.p.A..

In mid-August 2011, the funicular reopened after an overhaul costing €800,000. New cars were constructed for the line by Gangloff at a cost of €1 million each. The cars are painted in contrasting colours, one being lilac and the other red.

Route 
The lower station is situated adjacent to the Lake Como quayside to the north-east of Como city centre.

The remainder of the line is at or above ground level, with extensive views over the lake and city. There are two intermediate stops, served on request.

The upper station is situated in the centre of Brunate, with entrances and exits at both upper and lower levels. At the upper level, a piazza separates the station from the machine room, which has a gallery allowing public viewing of the haulage machinery. The surrounding area has vistas over Como and the lake, and is the starting point of many trails into the surrounding hills.

Operation 
The line has the following parameters:

See also 
 List of funicular railways

References

External links

Official web site of the Como–Brunate funicular
Video of ascent of the Como–Brunate funicular

Funicular railways in Italy
Railway lines in Lombardy
Railway lines opened in 1894
Metre gauge railways in Italy